Sun-4 is a series of Unix workstations and servers produced by Sun Microsystems, launched in 1987. The original Sun-4 series were VMEbus-based systems similar to the earlier Sun-3 series, but employing microprocessors based on Sun's own SPARC V7 RISC architecture in place of the 68k family processors of previous Sun models.

Sun 4/280 was known as base system that was used for building of first RAID prototype.

Models 
Models are listed in approximately chronological order.

{| class="wikitable sortable"
|-
!Model
!Codename
!CPU board
!CPU
!CPU MHz
!Max. RAM
!Chassis
|-
|4/260
|Sunrise
|Sun 4200
|Fujitsu SF9010 IU,Weitek 1164/1165 FPU
|16.67 MHz
|128 MB
|12-slot VME (deskside)
|-
|4/280
|Sunrise
|Sun 4200
|Fujitsu SF9010 IU,Weitek 1164/1165 FPU
|16.67 MHz
|128 MB
|12-slot VME (rackmount)
|- 
|4/110
|Cobra
|Sun 4100
|Fujitsu MB86900 IU,Weitek 1164/1165 FPU(optional)
|14.28 MHz
|32 MB
|3-slot VME (desktop/side)
|-
|4/150
|Cobra
|Sun 4100
|Fujitsu MB86900 IU,Weitek 1164/1165 FPU(optional)
|14.28 MHz
|32 MB
|6-slot VME (deskside)
|-
|4/310
|Stingray
|Sun 4300
|Cypress Semiconductor CY7C601,Texas Instruments 8847 FPU
|25 MHz
|32 MB
|3-slot VME (desktop/side)
|-
|4/330
|Stingray
|Sun 4300
|Cypress Semiconductor CY7C601,Texas Instruments 8847 FPU
|25 MHz
|96 MB
|3-slot VME w 2 memory slots (deskside)
|-
|4/350
|Stingray
|Sun 4300
|Cypress Semiconductor CY7C601,Texas Instruments 8847 FPU
|25 MHz
|224 MB
|5-slot VME (desktop/side)
|-
|4/360
|Stingray
|Sun 4300
|Cypress Semiconductor CY7C601,Texas Instruments 8847 FPU
|25 MHz
|224 MB
|12-slot VME (deskside)
|-
|4/370
|Stingray
|Sun 4300
|Cypress Semiconductor CY7C601,Texas Instruments 8847 FPU
|25 MHz
|224 MB
|12-slot VME (deskside)
|-
|4/380
|Stingray
|Sun 4300
|Cypress Semiconductor CY7C601,Texas Instruments 8847 FPU
|25 MHz
|224 MB
|12-slot VME (rackmount)
|-
|4/390
|Stingray
|Sun 4300
|Cypress Semiconductor CY7C601,Texas Instruments 8847 FPU
|25 MHz
|224 MB
|16-slot VME (rackmount)
|-
|4/470
|Sunray
|Sun 4400
|Cypress Semiconductor CY7C601,Texas Instruments 8847 FPU
|33 MHz
|768 MB
|16-slot VME (deskside)
|-
|4/490
|Sunray
|Sun 4400
|Cypress Semiconductor CY7C601,Texas Instruments 8847 FPU
|33 MHz
|768 MB
|12-slot VME (rackmount)
|}

In 1989, Sun dropped the "Sun-4" name for marketing purposes in favor of the SPARCstation and SPARCserver brands for new models, although early SPARCstation/server models were also assigned Sun-4-series model numbers. For example, the SPARCstation 1 was also known as the Sun 4/60. This practice was phased out with the introduction of the SPARCserver 600MP series in 1991. The term Sun-4  continued to be used in an engineering context to identify the basic hardware architecture of all SPARC-based Sun systems.

Sun 4/110, 4/150, 4/260 and 4/280 systems upgraded with the Sun 4300 CPU board (as used in the SPARCserver 300 series) were referred to as the 4/310, 4/350, 4/360 and 4/380 respectively.

Sun-4 architecture

The Sun-4 architecture refers to the VME-based architecture described above and used in the Sun 4/100, 4/200, SPARCserver 300 and SPARCserver 400 ranges. Sun-4 support was included in SunOS 3.2 onwards and Solaris 2.1 to 2.4. OpenBSD and NetBSD also will run on the Sun-4 architecture families.

Several variations on the Sun-4 architecture were subsequently developed and used in later computer systems produced by Sun and other vendors. These comprised:
Sun-4c (C presumably for Campus, the codename of the first Sun-4c model, the SPARCstation 1) This desktop workstation/low-end server variant substituted the 32-bit SBus expansion bus in place of VME and introduced a new MMU design. Supported by SunOS 4.0.3c onwards and Solaris 2.0 to 7.
Sun-4e A hybrid Sun-4c/VME architecture found in the SPARCengine 1 (Sun 4/E) VME embedded controller. This board was originally designed by Force Computers and licensed to Sun. Supported by SunOS 4.0.3e and 4.1e and Solaris 2.1 to 2.4.
Sun-4m Originally a multiprocessor Sun-4 variant, based on the MBus processor module bus introduced in the SPARCserver 600MP series. The Sun-4m architecture later also encompassed non-MBus uniprocessor systems such as the SPARCstation 5, utilizing SPARC V8-architecture processors. Supported by SunOS 4.1.2 onwards and Solaris 2.1 to 9. SPARCserver 600MP support was dropped after Solaris 2.5.1.
Sun-4d (D for Dragon, the codename of the SPARCcenter 2000) A high-end multiprocessor architecture, based on the XDBus processor interconnect, scalable up to 20 processors. The only Sun-4d systems produced by Sun were the SPARCserver 1000 and SPARCcenter 2000 series. The Cray CS6400 was also nominally a Sun-4d machine (sun4d6), although it required a custom version of Solaris. Supported by Solaris 2.2 to 8.
Sun-4u (U for UltraSPARC) - this variant introduced the 64-bit SPARC V9 processor architecture and UPA processor interconnect first used in the Sun Ultra series. Supported by 32-bit versions of Solaris from the version 2.5. The first 64-bit Solaris release for Sun4u is Solaris 7. UltraSPARC I support was dropped after Solaris 9. Solaris 10 supports Sun4u implementations from UltraSPARC II to UltraSPARC IV.
Sun-4u1 Sometimes used to identify the Sun Enterprise 10000 (Starfire) 64-way multiprocessor server architecture. The Starfire is supported by Solaris 2.5.1 onwards.
Sun-4us A variant of Sun-4u specific to Fujitsu PRIMEPOWER systems based on SPARC64 V processors.
Sun-4v (V presumably for "virtualized") A variation on Sun-4u which includes hypervisor processor virtualization; introduced in the UltraSPARC T1 (Niagara) multicore processor. Supported by Solaris version 10 starting from release 3/05 HW2, and Solaris 11.

References

External links
The Sun Hardware Reference, Part 1
Sun Field Engineer Handbook, 20th edition

Sun servers
Sun workstations
SPARC microprocessor products
Computer-related introductions in 1987
32-bit computers